Governor Gibbs may refer to:

A. C. Gibbs (1825–1886), 2nd Governor of Oregon
Humphrey Gibbs (1902–1990), Governor of Southern Rhodesia from 1959 to 1969
William C. Gibbs (1787–1871), 10th Governor of Rhode Island

See also
Robert Gibbes (1644–1715), 20th Colonial Governor of South Carolina